Chrysophylloideae is a subfamily of flowering plants in the chicle family, Sapotaceae.

Genera
Genera accepted by the Germplasm Resources Information Network as of December 2022:

 Achrouteria Eyma
 Amorphospermum F.Muell.
 Aubregrinia Heine
 Beccariella Pierre
 Breviea  Aubrév. & Pellegr.
 Chromolucuma  Ducke
 Chrysophyllum  L.
 Cornuella Pierre
 Delpydora Pierre
 Diploon Cronquist
 Donella Pierre ex Baill.
 Ecclinusa Mart.
 Elaeoluma Baill.
 Englerophytum K.Krause
 Gambeya Pierre
 Leptostylis Benth.
 Lucuma Molina
 Magodendron Vink
 Martiusella Pierre
 Micropholis (Griseb.) Pierre
 Nemaluma Baill.
 Niemeyera F.Muell.
 Omphalocarpum P.Beauv.
 Pichonia Pierre
 Planchonella Pierre
 Pleioluma Baill.
 Pouteria Aubl.
 Pradosia Liais
 Pycnandra Benth.
 Sahulia Swenson
 Sarcaulus Radlk.
 Sersalisia R.Br.
 Spiniluma (Baill.) Aubrév.
 Synsepalum (A.DC.) Daniell
 Tridesmostemon Engl.
 Van-royena Aubrév.
 Xantolis Raf.

References

External links

 
Asterid subfamilies